Calgary is a city in Alberta, Canada.

Calgary may also refer to:

 Calgary, Mull, a village and a bay on the Isle of Mull, Scotland, the namesake of the Canadian city
 Calligarry, Skye, locale (with a street named Calgary) on the Isle of Skye. (Macleod of Calgary was born on Skye).
 Fort Calgary, a historical North-West Mounted Police fort
 96192 Calgary, an asteroid
 , several warships
 "Calgary", a song by Bon Iver from the 2011 album Bon Iver
 Calgary corpus, a collection of text files for testing data compression algorithms

See also 
 South Calgary (disambiguation)
 Calvary, was, according to the Gospels, a site immediately outside Jerusalem's walls where Jesus was crucified. Golgotha(s) (Γολγοθάς) is the Greek transcription in the New Testament of an Aramaic term that has traditionally been presumed to be Gûlgaltâ